Avondale is an unincorporated community located in McDowell County, West Virginia, United States. Avondale lies along the Norfolk and Western Railroad on the Dry Fork. According to the Geographic Names Information System, the community has also been known as Ritter having been named after William McLellan Ritter, founder of the W.M. Ritter company.

References 

Unincorporated communities in McDowell County, West Virginia
Unincorporated communities in West Virginia